The 2020–21 California Baptist Lancers men's basketball team represented California Baptist University in the 2020–21 NCAA Division I men's basketball season. The Lancers, led by eighth-year head coach Rick Croy, played their home games at the CBU Events Center in Riverside, California as members of the Western Athletic Conference.

The season marked CBU's third year of a four-year transition period from Division II to Division I. As a result, the Lancers were not eligible for NCAA postseason play, but could participate in the WAC tournament. They were eligible to play in the CIT or CBI, but not invited.

Previous season
The Lancers finished the 2019–20 season finished the season 21–10, 10–6 in WAC play to finish in second place.

Roster

Schedule and results

|-
!colspan=12 style=| Regular season

|-
!colspan=9 style=| WAC tournament

|-

Source

References

California Baptist Lancers men's basketball seasons
California Baptist Lancers
California Baptist Lancers men's basketball
California Baptist Lancers men's basketball